Makharbek Khasbiyevich Khadartsev (born 2 October 1964) is a former Soviet wrestler who later competed for Russia and Uzbekistan, two times Olympic champion and five times world champion in Freestyle wrestling. He was born in Suadag, Alagirsky District, North Ossetia.

Olympics
Khadartsev competed at the 1988 Summer Olympics in Seoul, where he received a gold medal in Freestyle wrestling, the light heavyweight class.

He won a second gold medal at the 1992 Summer Olympics in Barcelona.

Competing for Russia at the 1996 Summer Olympics in Atlanta, he received a silver medal. At the 2000 Summer Olympics, he placed 14th while competing for Uzbekistan.

World championships

Khadartsev won a gold medal at the 1986 FILA Wrestling World Championships in Budapest.  He received gold medals also in 1987, 1989, 1990 and 1991.

References

External links
 

1964 births
Living people
Soviet male sport wrestlers
Uzbekistani male sport wrestlers
Olympic wrestlers of the Soviet Union
Olympic wrestlers of the Unified Team
Olympic wrestlers of Russia
Olympic wrestlers of Uzbekistan
Wrestlers at the 1988 Summer Olympics
Wrestlers at the 1992 Summer Olympics
Wrestlers at the 1996 Summer Olympics
Wrestlers at the 2000 Summer Olympics
Russian male sport wrestlers
Olympic gold medalists for the Soviet Union
Olympic gold medalists for the Unified Team
Olympic silver medalists for Russia
Ossetian people
People from Alagirsky District
Olympic medalists in wrestling
World Wrestling Championships medalists
Medalists at the 1996 Summer Olympics
Medalists at the 1992 Summer Olympics
Medalists at the 1988 Summer Olympics
Sportspeople from North Ossetia–Alania
Russian emigrants to Uzbekistan
Uzbekistani people of Ossetian descent
Sixth convocation members of the State Duma (Russian Federation)